Érik Marchand (born 1955) is a Breton traditional singer and player of the treujenn-gaol (Breton clarinet).  Although born in Paris, his family was of Breton origin, hailing from Quelneuc, Brittany.

Influenced by the music of Manuel Kerjean, Marchand moved to his family's homeland and studied traditional music and the Breton language.  He became deeply involved with traditional Breton singing, including the gwerz, a traditional lament.  In the 1980s he helped form a traditional music group called  which released three albums.  In the 1980s Marchand also began to collaborate with oudist Thierry Robin, producing a fusion of Celtic and Arabic motifs influenced by jazz.

Discography

1982 :  Chants à danser de Haute-Bretagne, with Gilbert Bourdin ha Christian Dautel, Dastum
1985 :  Gwerz, nouvelle musique de Bretagne, Dastum/Gwerz
1985 :  Chants à répondre de Haute-Bretagne, with Gilbert Bourdin and Christian Dautel, Le Chasse-Marée
1988 : Gwerz :  Au-delà, Escalibur. Priz bras an Akademiezh Charles Cros 1988
1989 :  Gwerz Penmarc’h, with Cabestan, Le Chasse-Marée
1990 :  An henchoù treuz, chants du Centre-Bretagne, gant Thierry Robin, AMTA/Ocora, Priz bras an Akademiezh Charles Cros 1990
1991 : Trio Erik Marchand :  An tri Breur, Silex, ffff Télérama
1991 : Musique têtue gant le Quintet de Clarinettes, Silex, ffff Télérama
1993 :  Gwerz live, Gwerz Pladenn
1993 :  Bazh du  with le Quintet de Clarinettes, Silex. Diapason d’Or
1993 : Erik Marchand et le Taraf de Caransebes :  Sag an tan ell, Silex. Priz bras an Akademiezh Charles Cros 1995 ha ffff Télérama
1997 : Fresu, Pellen, Marchand trio :  Condaghes, Silex, Choc de la Musique
1998 : Erik Marchand et le Taraf de Caransebes :  Dor, BMG, ffff Télérama, Choc de la Musique, R 10 de Répertoires
2001 :  Kan, gant l’ensemble de Mallakaster d’Albanie, Le Tenore de Santu Predu (Sardaigne), Fransy Gonzales-Calvo (Galice) ha Bassey Koné (Mali), fff Télérama
2003 :  La Route de la Rose, Attitudes
2003 :  Le Requiem d’Anna Ac’hmatova 
2003 Ephéméra Jacques Pellen Naïve
2004 PRUNA Erik Marchand et les Balkaniks Harmonia Mundi 2741260
2013 Ukronia

Decorations 
 Chevalier of the Order of Arts and Letters (2016)

References

1955 births
Living people
Musicians from Paris
Breton musicians
Chevaliers of the Ordre des Arts et des Lettres
Breton-language singers